Frédéric Keiff, born in 1973 in Metz, France is an architect and artist who lives and works in Strasbourg (France).

Biography

Frédéric Keiff is a postgraduate at the Faculty of Arts of Strasbourg in 2000, graduated in architecture at the ENSAS of Strasbourg in 2001. Since then, he devoted himself to ar(t)chitectural research, in-between urban self-built collective experiments, and personal plastic research. In 2001 he founded the collective 3RS Charles Altorffer in Strasbourg. He is an active member of the first hour in the EXYZT group formed in 2003 in Paris.

After graduation in 2001, he started a reflection on the human body as a unit of architecture, referring to Vitruvius, Leonardo da Vinci, Le Corbusier, to determine the archetype to place at the heart of contemporary architecture. But rather than marring an ideal, a perfect modular, his quest is more about the definition of a variable geometry model, incorporating therein the particulars and deformities of all. He questions the differences that make humanity what it is, i.e. a set of non-interchangeable singularities. In recent years, light has taken a special place in his artistic production with the construction of special windows, such as recovering debris of glass and assembling them on flexible silicone structures.

In 2006, he worked on Vitraux Vivo at Mozet, Belgium. In 2007, in residence in Douala, he offers the city the work Arbre à palabres (Palaver Tree). In 2011 he participated in the group exhibition A view of urbanity organized by the General Council of 67 in Strasbourg (France). In 2013 he did the performance the Surviving Pablo at La Semencerie  in Strasbourg (France) and, in the same year, he offered the city of Le Havre (France) the work Arbōat, a monumental sculpture created in collaboration with Coal. Recently, he worked on The Feasting Mouth (2014), a monumental sculpture project carried out with the Tate Modern of London, United Kingdom, as well as the collective exhibition Ateliers Nomades, Depo2015 in the Cultural Capital of 2015, Pilsen (Czech Republic).

Artworks 
 OOT (One of Them), 2009
 L'Arbre à palabres, Douala, 2007
 Vitraux in Vivo, Mozet, Belgique 2006

Expositions 
 Le Forum, Nuit Blanche de l'Art Contemporain de Metz avec le collectif 3rs, 2008
 Southwark Lido, Biennale d'architecture de Londres avec le collectif exyzt, 2008
 Hotel Ephémère des Trinitaires, rencontres de la FRAAP à Metz avec le collectif 3rs, mai 2008
 L'Arbres à Palabres, dans le cadre du Salon Urbain de Douala (SUD) organisé par Doual'art, 2007
 Participation au projet Labichampi : construction d'une structure pour une reconversion économique et sociale d'une ruine en exploitation en Lettonie, 2007
 Biennale de Venise, Projet collectif EXYZT, pavillon français, 2006
 Exposition aux Ateliers Ouverts à Strasbourg, 2006
 Exposition de sculpture et vitraux au salon de Printemps à Strasbourg, 2006

Bibliography
 At Work (2007). L’arbre à palabres. http://www.at-work.org/fr/carnet/frederic-keiff-carnet/
 Pensa, Iolanda (Ed.) 2017. Public Art in Africa. Art et transformations urbaines à Douala /// Art and Urban Transformations in Douala. Genève: Metis Presses.

See also 
 List of public art in Douala

External links
 Collectif d'architectes 3RS
 website of the artist

1973 births
Living people
Artists from Metz
21st-century French architects